San Jacinto National Forest was established as the San Jacinto Forest Reserve by the General Land Office in California on February 22, 1897 with . After the transfer of federal forests to the U.S. Forest Service in 1905, it became a National Forest on March 4, 1907. On July 1, 1908 the entire forest was combined with Trabuco Canyon National Forest to establish Cleveland National Forest, and the name was discontinued.

References

External links
Forest History Society
Listing of the National Forests of the United States and Their Dates (from the Forest History Society website) Text from Davis, Richard C., ed. Encyclopedia of American Forest and Conservation History. New York: Macmillan Publishing Company for the Forest History Society, 1983. Vol. II, pp. 743-788.

Former National Forests of California